A Consulate is a diplomatic mission, the office of a consul.

Consulate may also refer to:

 the office or term of any official styled Consul, originally a magistrate of the Roman Republic
 Consulate of the Sea, a Catalan medieval judicial organ for commerce
 French Consulate, the government of republican France from 1799 to 1804
 a brand of menthol cigarette introduced by Rothmans International

See also
Consularis, a Latin word derived from Consul